Pilcomayo is a department in the Argentine province of Formosa. Its capital is Clorinda, the second most populous city in the province. Other communities in Pilcomayo include Laguna Blanca, Laguna Naick Neck, Riacho He-Hé and Siete Palmas. The Pilcomayo River National Park (Parque Nacional Río Pilcomayo) is about 45 kilometers west of Clorinda, crossed by the Pilcomayo River.

External links
Pilcomayo Travel guide

Departments of Formosa Province